Bang Phlap is one of the twelve subdistricts (tambon) of Pak Kret District, in Nonthaburi Province, Thailand. Neighbouring subdistricts are (from north clockwise) Lahan, Khlong Khoi, Khlong Phra Udom, Ko Kret, Om Kret and Phimon Rat. In 2020 it had a total population of 10,899 people.

Administration

Central administration
The subdistrict is subdivided into 5 administrative villages (muban).

Local administration
The whole area of the subdistrict is covered by Bang Phlap Subdistrict Municipality.

References

External links
Website of Bang Phlap Subdistrict Municipality

Tambon of Nonthaburi province
Populated places in Nonthaburi province